"When Love Breaks Down" is a single by English pop band Prefab Sprout, first released by Kitchenware Records in October 1984. It was the first single taken from their album of the following year, Steve McQueen. On its first release, the single did not chart in the UK Singles Chart, but it was reissued in 1985, reaching No. 25. The song was also the group's first chart appearance in the United States, peaking at No. 42 on the Billboard Top Rock Tracks chart in October 1985.

"When Love Breaks Down" was recorded and mixed at RAK Studios, London. The song was re-released in March 2007, this time with an entirely new acoustic arrangement, recorded in 2006 by frontman Paddy McAloon to coincide with the two-disc Legacy Edition of Steve McQueen.

The B-side to the original single release was "Diana", which would later be re-recorded and included on the album Protest Songs (which was originally going to be released after Steve McQueen but was shelved until 1989).

Cover versions
The song has been covered by many artists including the Zombies, E'voke, Kate Walsh, Lisa Stansfield, Portastatic,  Snow Patrol and Nerina Pallot.

In popular culture
The song appeared in Grand Theft Auto: Episodes from Liberty City fictional radio station, Vice City FM.

Charts

References

.

1984 singles
Prefab Sprout songs
Songs written by Paddy McAloon
1984 songs
Lisa Stansfield songs